Cable is a town in Bayfield County, Wisconsin, United States. Its population was 825 at the 2010 U.S. census. The census-designated place of Cable and the unincorporated communities of Leonards and Radspur are located in the town.

Geography

The Namekagon River, a tributary of the St. Croix River and part of the Saint Croix National Scenic Riverway, passes through the town.

Demographics
As of the census of 2000, there were 836 people, 381 households, and 230 families residing in the town. The population density was 12.1 people per square mile (4.7/km2). There were 697 housing units at an average density of 10.1 per square mile (3.9/km2). The racial makeup of the town was 99.16% White, 0.24% Native American, 0.12% Asian, 0.24% from other races, and 0.24% from two or more races. Hispanic or Latino of any race were 0.12% of the population.

There were 381 households, out of which 24.1% had children under the age of 18 living with them, 49.9% were married couples living together, 6.6% had a female householder with no husband present, and 39.4% were non-families. 32.3% of all households were made up of individuals, and 11.5% had someone living alone who was 65 years of age or older. The average household size was 2.19 and the average family size was 2.76.

In the town, the population was spread out, with 22.1% under the age of 18, 3.2% from 18 to 24, 30.1% from 25 to 44, 28.5% from 45 to 64, and 16.0% who were 65 years of age or older. The median age was 42 years. For every 100 females, there were 104.9 males. For every 100 females age 18 and over, there were 104.1 males.

The median income for a household in the town was $31,250, and the median income for a family was $36,250. Males had a median income of $26,645 versus $16,484 for females. The per capita income for the town was $16,985.  About 8.5% of families and 11.8% of the population were below the poverty line, including 16.3% of those under age 18 and 13.6% of those age 65 or over.

Transportation
U.S. Highway 63 and County Highway M serve as main routes in the community. Cable is served by the Cable Union Airport .

Recreation
Cable is the starting point of the American Birkebeiner cross-country skiing race, which ends in nearby Hayward, and the end point of the Chequamegon Fat Tire Festival mountain bike race.

References

External links
Town of Cable official website
Cable Area Chamber of Commerce

Towns in Bayfield County, Wisconsin
Towns in Wisconsin